Douglas Methven Farquhar (11 June 1921 – 20 February 2005) was a Scottish-American soccer player who played professionally on both sides of the Atlantic Ocean.  He also earned one cap with the United States national team

Club career
Farquhar started his career at junior side St Andrews United, before joining Arsenal in 1944. During World War II he guested with Irish side Distillery. He was exclusively a reserve player with Arsenal, never playing a first-team game, although he won a Football Combination medal with the second-string side in 1946–47.

In September 1950 he joined Reading on a free transfer.  He played nine league games, scoring one goal.  He then moved to non-league Hereford United and Bedford Town.  In May 1957, he moved to the USA, where he signed with the New York Hakoah of the American Soccer League.

International career
Farquhar earned one cap with the U.S. national team in an 8–1 loss to England on 28 May 1959. At nearly 38 years old, he was the oldest player to make his international debut in any England match.

See also
List of United States men's international soccer players born outside the United States

References

1921 births
2005 deaths
Scottish footballers
American soccer players
Arsenal F.C. players
Reading F.C. players
Hereford United F.C. players
Bedford Town F.C. players
British emigrants to the United States
United States men's international soccer players
American Soccer League (1933–1983) players
New York Hakoah players
People from Methil
Association football midfielders